Weedin Park is a public park in Troutdale, Oregon, United States. Developers of the Weedin Addition Subdivision dedicated the park in 1980.

References

External links

 

1980 establishments in Oregon
Parks in Multnomah County, Oregon
Troutdale, Oregon